Elizabeth Allo Isichei (born 1939 in Tauranga, New Zealand) is an author, historian and academic. Her parents are Albert (an agricultural scientist) and Lorna Allo. On 23 July 1964 she married Uche Peter Isichei (a chemical pathologist) and they have five children. In 1959 she earned her BA from the University of Canterbury in New Zealand, B.A. In 1961 she completed her M.A. at Victoria University of Wellington, New Zealand, and in 1967 she completed her PhD at Oxford University. She was a Professor of Religious Studies at the University of Otago. She has been a professor in the Department of History, University of Jos in Jos, Nigeria since 1976. She is the general editor for Jos Oral History and Literature Texts.

Her works and books are centered on Christianity in Africa and the history of Nigeria particularly the Igbo people.

Selected works
 1964: Political Thinking and Social Experience: Some Christian Interpretations of the Roman Empire, University of Canterbury Publications
 1970: Victorian Quakers, Oxford University Press
 1973: The Ibo People and the Europeans: The Genesis of a Relationship, to 1906, St. Martin's
 1976: A History of the Igbo People, St. Martin's
 1977: A History of West Africa since 1800, Africana
 1977: Igbo Worlds: An Anthology of Oral History and Historical Descriptions, Institute for the Study of Human Issues
 1981: Entirely for God: The Life of Michael Iwene Tansi, Macmillan Nigeria
 1982: Studies in the History of Plateau State, Nigeria, Macmillan
 1983: A History of Nigeria, Longman
 1995: A History of Christianity in Africa: From Antiquity to the Present, Africa World Press
 1997: A History of African Societies to 1870, Cambridge University Press
 2002: Voices of the Poor in Africa, University of Rochester Press (Rochester, NY)
 2004: The Religious Traditions of Africa: A History, Raeger (Westport, CT)
 2005: Stoptide, Steele Roberts (New Zealand)

References

Living people
Academic staff of the University of Otago
Nigerian women writers
1939 births
20th-century Australian women writers
20th-century Australian writers
20th-century Nigerian writers
Victoria University of Wellington alumni
New Zealand women academics